is a railway station in the town of Yuza, Yamagata Prefecture, Japan, operated by East Japan Railway Company (JR East).

Lines
Mega Station is served by the Uetsu Main Line, and is located 189.7 kilometers from the starting point of the line at Niitsu Station.

Station layout
The station has two opposed side platforms connected by a level crossing; however, only one platform is in use, with the other reserved for passage of express trains. The station is unattended.

Platforms

History

The station opened on April 1, 1987.

Surrounding area
Misaki Park

See also
 List of railway stations in Japan

References

External links

  

Stations of East Japan Railway Company
Railway stations in Japan opened in 1987
Railway stations in Yamagata Prefecture
Uetsu Main Line
Yuza, Yamagata